Donald James Moen (born June 29, 1950) is an American singer, pianist, and songwriter of Christian worship music.

Early and personal life 

Moen grew up in Minneapolis, Minnesota where he attended high school in 1968. Moen attended Oral Roberts University, a Christian liberal arts school.

Moen married Laura in 1973.

Career 

He became a Living Sound musician for Terry Law Ministries and traveled with Terry Law for ten years. After, he worked for Integrity Media for over 20 years, serving as creative director and president of Integrity Music, president of Integrity Label Group, and an executive producer of Integrity Music albums. He left Integrity Media in December 2007 to start a new initiative, The Don Moen Company. The Don Moen Company acquired MediaComplete, the church software company that created MediaShout. Moen became a radio host for Don Moen & Friends in 2009. Moen received a Dove Award for his work on the musical God with Us in addition to nine nominations for his songs.

Moen also worked with Claire Cloninger, Paul Overstreet, Martin J. Nystrom, Randy Rothwell, Ron Kenoly, Bob Fitts, Debbye Graafsma, Paul Baloche, Tom Brooks, among many others. He worked with musicians, Justo Almario, Carl Albrecht, Abraham Laboriel, Alex Acuña, Paul Jackson, Jr., Lenny LeBlanc and Chris Graham. He was a catalyst in launching the careers of Paul Baloche, Darlene Zschech, Israel Houghton, and Hillsong United.

He produced 11 volumes for the Hosanna! Music series of worship albums. His first album under his own name, Worship with Don Moen, was released in 1992. His music has total global sales of over five million units.

Moen's first album for Hosanna! Music, Give Thanks, became the label's bestseller. Produced by Tom Brooks, Give Thanks went on to be certified Gold by the RIAA. Moen followed this with a number of albums of his own including two, En Tu Presencia and Trono De Gracia, in Spanish. God with Us won the Dove Award for Best Musical. On an Asian tour in 1999 he recorded The Mercy Seat at Singapore Indoor Stadium and Heal Our Land at Yoido Park in South Korea, which was released in 2000. One of Moen's albums, I Will Sing, was recorded at Christian Broadcasting Network.

God Will Make a Way: The Best of Don Moen was released in 2003 and features 19 greatest hits. The title song was written for his sister-in-law and her husband, whose oldest son died in an auto accident while their other three children survived but were seriously injured. Moen's Hiding Place became his first studio album which was recorded at Paragon Studios in Franklin, Tennessee, and was released in the autumn of 2006. I Believe There Is More released in late 2008. His third studio recording titled Uncharted Territory (funded successfully through Kickstarter) released on March 27, 2012. His Christmas album, Christmas: A Season of Hope, was released on October 22, 2012, and some songs were recorded at a studio in Czech Republic. Moen released Hymnbook as a celebration of reaching over 1 million likes on his Facebook page.

Discography

Other recordings 

 Hatiku (1995)
 Behold the Lamb (1997)
 Healing (1998)
 The Smithton Outpouring (1999)
 Hope Changes Everything (2000)
 Mas de Ti (2000)
 Sing for Joy: A Songwriter's Heart (2002)
 Amor Sin Limites (2004)
 American Worship Gathering (2005)
 Arise: A Celebration of Worship (2006)
 Hope Changes Everything (2007)
 Cool Worship (2010)
 A Little Boy's Prayer (2010)
 Marvin L. Winans Presents: The Praise & Worship Experience (2012)
 Bishop Jerry L. Maynard Presents: The Cathedral of Praise Choir (2012)
 Day and Night Worship (2015)
 We Will Stand (2015)

Awards and nominations 

Gold certification
 Give Thanks

References

External links 
 

21st-century American singers
1950 births
American male singer-songwriters
American people of Norwegian descent
American performers of Christian music
American male violinists
Christian music songwriters
Columbia Records artists
Performers of contemporary worship music
Epic Records artists
Living people
Singer-songwriters from Tennessee
Oral Roberts University alumni
Musicians from Minneapolis
Sparrow Records artists
Spanish-language singers of the United States
Singer-songwriters from Minnesota
20th-century American pianists
American male pianists
21st-century American pianists
21st-century American violinists
20th-century American male musicians
21st-century American male singers
Singer-songwriters from Alabama